Shahid Mofatteh may refer to the following named after assassinated Iranian cleric Mohammad Mofatteh:
Shahid Mofatteh, Iran, a village in Khuzestan Province
Shahid Mofatteh Stadium, a stadium in Hamedan, Iran
Shahid Mofatteh Metro Station, a station in Tehran